Cafaggio may refer to:

Cafaggio, Ameglia, a village in the province of La Spezia, Italy
Cafaggio, Campiglia Marittima, a village in the province of Livorno, Italy
Cafaggio, Capolona, a village in the province of Arezzo, Italy
Cafaggio, Prato, a village in the province of Prato, Italy